Zwolle is the main railway station of Zwolle in Overijssel, Netherlands. The station opened on 6 June 1864 and is on the Utrecht–Kampen railway, also known as the Centraalspoorweg, the Zwolle–Almelo railway, the Arnhem–Leeuwarden railway, the Zwolle–Stadskanaal railway and the Lelystad–Zwolle railway, also known as the Hanzelijn.

The station is a major hub for the Northern Netherlands. It is the only way trains can get from the north of the country, to any other region of the Netherlands.

ZwolleSpoort
On 31 August 2010, the principal stakeholders in the railway station—ProRail, Nederlandse Spoorwegen and the municipality of Zwolle—started the ZwolleSpoort project. This project included a major renovation of the existing station, an increase in capacity and an overhaul of the entire public transportation organization in the city. The immediate starting point for the project was the Hanzelijn project, which was expected to increase passenger traffic by 33% in the period up to 2020. In order to deal with the extra traffic, the passenger tunnel (which was 5 meters wide) in the station was replaced by a new tunnel 17 meters wide and 120 meters long. The new tunnel, which opened on 26 June 2015, leads onto a new bus terminal at the southern end of the station. The tunnel also features shopping facilities.

In addition, the project entailed increasing the capacity and efficiency of the railway emplacement. The new Hanzelijn was accommodated by a new, fourth railway platform and by replacing the 34 points near the station with 15 longer ones which allow a more efficient railway pattern and allow trains to pass at higher speeds.

Train services
, the following train services call at this station:
Express services:
Intercity: The Hague, Schiphol, Amsterdam Zuid, Almere, Lelystad, Zwolle, and Groningen
Intercity: The Hague, Schiphol, Amsterdam Zuid, Almere, Lelystad, Zwolle, and Leeuwarden
Intercity: Rotterdam, Utrecht, Amersfoort, Zwolle, and Groningen
Intercity: Rotterdam, Utrecht, Amersfoort, Zwolle, and Leeuwarden
Intercity: Zwolle, Deventer, Arnhem, Nijmegen, 's-Hertogenbosch, and Roosendaal
Sneltrein: Zwolle, Hardenberg, and Emmen
Sneltrein: Zwolle, Hardenberg, and Coevorden (peak hours)
Local services:
Stoptrein: Zwolle, Hardenberg, and Emmen
Sprinter: Utrecht, Amersfoort, and Zwolle
Sprinter: The Hague, Leiden, Amsterdam, Almere, Lelystad, and Zwolle
Sprinter: Zwolle, Almelo, Hengelo, and Enschede
Sprinter: Zwolle, and Kampen
Sprinter: Zwolle, Assen, and Groningen

Bus services

Many bus services also depart from the bus stations outside the station. These include services all over the city and regional services to Harderwijk, Apeldoorn, Urk, Steenwijk, Meppel, Coevorden, Ommen, Raalte and Deventer. NS means the service calls at the railway station.

 1 – Stadshagen to Frankhuis, Deltion Campus, Zwolle railway station, and Oosterenk (town service)
 2 – Ittersumbroek to Oldenerlanden, Zwolle railway station, Diezerpoort, and Holterbroek (town service)
 3 – Zwolle railway station to Assendorp, Diezerpoort, and Berkum (town service)
 4 – Ittersumbroek to Oldenerbroek, Schellerhoek, Zwolle railway station, Arcadia, Berkum-Brinkhoek, and AA-landen (town service)
 5 – Zwolle railway station to Westenholte (town service)
 7 – Zwolle railway station to Assendorp, and Oosterenk (town service)
 8 – Zwolle railway station to Schellerlanden Campus (town service)
 9 – Zwolle railway station to Deltion Campus (town service)
 11 – Zwolle railway station to Stadion, and Rechterland (town service)
 29 – Zwolle railway station to Ruitenveen, Nieuwenleusen, Balkbrug, Dedemsvaart, Lutten, Slagharen, De Krim, and Coevorden NS
 40 – Zwolle railway station to - Lichtmis - Rouveen - Staphorst - Meppel NS - Nijeveen - Steenwijk NS
 70 – Zwolle railway station to Genne, Hasselt, Zwartsluis, Giethoorn, and Steenwijk NS
 71 – Zwolle railway station to Hasselt, Zwartsluis, Zieltje, St Jansklooster, Vollenhove, Marknesse, Kraggenburg, and Emmeloord
 74 – Zwolle railway station to Hasselt, Genemuiden, IJsselmuiden, and Kampen NS
 100 – Zwolle railway station to Oldebroek, Wezep, Elburg, and Nunspeet
 141 – Zwolle railway station to 's-Heerenbroek, Wilsum, Kampen NS, Kampereiland, Ens, Emmelooord, Tollebeek, and Urk
 161 – Zwolle railway station to Windesheim, Wijhe, Den Nul, Olst, Boskamp, Diepenveen, and Deventer NS
 166 – Zwolle railway station to Wijthmen, Lenthe, Raalte, and Heino NS
 167 – Zwolle railway station to Wijthmen, Hoonhorst, Dalfsen NS, Oudleusen, and Ommen NS
 171 – Zwolle railway station to Hasselt, Zwartsluis, Zieltje, St Jansklooster, Vollenhove, Marknesse, and Emmeloord
 200S – Zwolle railway station to Oldebroek, Elburg, and 't Harde (peak hours only)
 201 – Zwolle railway station to Apeldoorn NS (express via A50 motorway)
 203 – Zwolle railway station to Hattem, Wapenveld, Heerde, Epe, and Apeldoorn NS

See also
Railway stations in the Netherlands
Dutch railway services

References

External links

Buildings and structures in Zwolle
Railway stations in Overijssel
Railway stations opened in 1864
Railway stations on the Centraalspoorweg
Railway stations on the Emmerlijn
Railway stations on the Hanzelijn
Railway stations on the IJssellijn
Railway stations on the Staatslijn A
Railway stations on the Veluwelijn